Come On George! is a 1939 British comedy film directed by Anthony Kimmins which stars George Formby, with Pat Kirkwood and Joss Ambler in support. It was made by Associated Talking Pictures. Hal Erickson wrote in Allmovie: "Come on George! was a product of George Formby's peak movie years." It concerns the world of horse racing, and Formby, who had once been a stable apprentice, did his own riding in the film. Songs featured are "I'm Making Headway Now", "I Couldn't Let The Stable Down", "Pardon Me", and "Goodnight Little Fellow, Goodnight".

Plot
In this farce, Formby plays a stable boy. He also has the unique ability to soothe an anxious racing horse. Expectedly, George races the horse and wins.

Cast
 George Formby as George
 Pat Kirkwood as Ann Johnson
 Joss Ambler as Sir Charles Bailey - the owner of the racehorse 'Maneater'
 Meriel Forbes as Monica Bailey
 Cyril Raymond as Jimmy Taylor
 George Hayes as Bannerman
 George Carney as Sergeant Johnson
 Ronald Shiner as Nat
 Gibb McLaughlin as Dr MacGregor
 Hal Gordon as Stable Boy
 Davy Burnaby as Colonel Bollinger 
 Leo Franklyn as Bannerman's Trainer (uncredited)
 Diana Beaumont as Nurse (uncredited)
 James Hayter as Barker 
 C. Denier Warren as Banker 
 Syd Crossley as Police Constable Cronley 
 Dirk Bogarde (uncredited extra)
 Jack May as stable boy (uncredited)

Critical reception
 According to TV Guide "this is one of" Formby's "lesser efforts".
 Halliwell's Film Guide noted a "standard comedy vehicle, well-mounted, with the star at his box office peak".
In "thiswaydown.org", Finn Clark wrote: "the first half isn't very good...However the story picks up as it moves along until by the end, it's a charming little romp that made me laugh and made me happy".

References

Bibliography
 Low, Rachael. Filmmaking in 1930s Britain. George Allen & Unwin, 1985.
 Perry, George. Forever Ealing. Pavilion Books, 1994.
 Wood, Linda. British Films, 1927-1939. British Film Institute, 1986.

External links
 
 
 

1939 films
1939 musical comedy films
British black-and-white films
British musical comedy films
Films directed by Anthony Kimmins
British sports comedy films
British horse racing films
Films set in England
Associated Talking Pictures
1930s sports comedy films
1930s English-language films
1930s British films